The Tetapaga River is a small river in Nipissing District of Northeastern Ontario, Canada that runs southwest through Briggs Township from its source at Tetapaga Lake. The river flows  before emptying into an unnamed bay of Lake Temagami.

References

Rivers of Temagami